4 Lions Films is a production house based in Mumbai, India. Founded in 2008, its primary focus is youth-oriented and general entertainment shows.

Operations
The production house has produced successful shows like Geet... Hui Sabse Parayi, Iss Pyaar Ko Kya Naam Doon?, Qubool Hai, Ishqbaaaz, Kullfi Kumarr Bajewala, Yehh Jaadu Hai Jinn Ka, and Imlie.

Current programs

Upcoming programs

Former programs

Web series

See also 

 List of accolades received by Ishqbaaaz

References

External links
 Official Website

Companies based in Mumbai
Television production companies of India
Entertainment companies of India
Entertainment companies established in 2008
Indian companies established in 2008
2008 establishments in Maharashtra